Exequiel Dario Beltramone (born 9 February 1999) is an Argentine professional footballer who plays as a winger for Gimnasia Jujuy, on loan from Talleres.

Club career
Beltramone is a product of Talleres' academy. In July 2019, Beltramone was loaned out to Primera B Nacional with Mitre. He made his senior debut on 13 October against Deportivo Morón, replacing Diego Auzqui in a 1–1 draw. That was his only appearance for them. In February 2020, Beltramone left on loan to Racing de Córdoba of Torneo Regional Federal Amateur. He appeared three times before the COVID-enforced break. On 30 October, back with Talleres, Beltramone made the first-team squad for a Copa de la Liga Profesional win over Newell's Old Boys; he went unused on the bench.

To end 2020, Beltramone had a one-month loan stint in Torneo Federal A with Sportivo Las Parejas. He featured four times, thrice as a starter, for them. On 5 February 2021, Beltramone was loaned to Spain's Tercera División with Flat Earth; penning terms until July, with the club not paying a fee or agreeing a purchase option.

International career
Beltramone previously received training call-ups to Argentina's U19s and U20s.

Career statistics
.

References

External links

1999 births
Living people
People from Castellanos Department
Argentine footballers
Argentine expatriate footballers
Association football forwards
Sportspeople from Santa Fe Province
Primera Nacional players
Torneo Federal A players
Talleres de Córdoba footballers
Club Atlético Mitre footballers
Racing de Córdoba footballers
Sportivo Las Parejas footballers
Flat Earth FC players
Tlaxcala F.C. players
Gimnasia y Esgrima de Jujuy footballers
Expatriate footballers in Spain
Expatriate footballers in Mexico
Argentine expatriate sportspeople in Spain
Argentine expatriate sportspeople in Mexico